Sinhala (Sinhala: ,), sometimes called Sinhalese, is an Indo-Aryan language primarily spoken by the Sinhalese people of Sri Lanka, who make up the largest ethnic group on the island, numbering about 16 million. Sinhala is also spoken as the first language by other ethnic groups in Sri Lanka, totalling about 2 million people as of 2001. It is written using the Sinhala script, which is a Brahmic script closely related to the Grantha script of South India.

Sinhala is one of the official and national languages of Sri Lanka. Along with Pali, it played a major role in the development of Theravada Buddhist literature.

The early form of the Sinhala language is attested as early as the 3rd century BCE. The language of these inscriptions with long vowels and aspirated consonants is a Prakrit similar to Magadhi, a regional associate of the Middle Indian Prakrits that has been used during the time of the Buddha. The closest relatives are the Vedda language (an endangered, indigenous creole still spoken by a minority of Sri Lankans, mixing Sinhala with an isolate of unknown origin and from which Old Sinhala borrowed various aspects into its main Indo-Aryan substrate), and the Maldivian language.
It has two main varieties, written and spoken, and is a conspicuous example of the linguistic phenomenon known as diglossia.

Etymology 

The name is sometimes glossed as 'abode of lions', and attributed to a supposed former abundance of lions on the island.

History 
According to the chronicle Mahavansa, written in Pali, Vanga kingdom's Prince Vijaya and his entourage merged with the Yakkha and later settlers from the Pandya kingdom. In the following centuries, there was substantial immigration from Eastern India (Vanga Kingdom (Bengal), Kalinga, Magadha) which led to an admixture of features of Eastern Prakrits.

Stages of historical development 
The development of Sinhala is divided into four epochs:

 Sinhala Prakrit (3rd c BCE to 4th c CE)
 Proto-Sinhala (4th c CE to 8th c CE)
 Medieval Sinhala (8th c CE to 13th c CE)
 Modern Sinhala (13th c CE to the present)

Phonetic development 
The most important phonetic developments of Sinhala include:
 the loss of the aspiration distinction (e.g. kanavā "to eat" corresponds to Sanskrit khādati, Hindustani khānā)
 the loss of original vowel length distinction; long vowels in the modern language are due to loanwords (e.g. vibāgaya "exam" < Sanskrit vibhāga) and sandhi, either after elision of Intervocalic consonants (e.g. dānavā "to put" < damanavā) or in originally compound words.
 the simplification of consonant clusters and geminate consonants into geminates and single consonants respectively (e.g. Sanskrit viṣṭā "time" > Sinhalese Prakrit viṭṭa > Modern Sinhala viṭa)

Western vs. Eastern Prakrit features 
According to Wilhelm Geiger, an example of a possible Western feature in Sinhala is the retention of initial  which developed into  in the Eastern languages (e.g. Sanskrit viṃśati "twenty", Sinhala visi-, Hindi bīs). This is disputed by Muhammad Shahidullah who says that Sinhala Prakrit branched off from the Eastern Prakrits prior to this change. He cites the inscriptions of Asoka, none of which show this sound change.

An example of an Eastern feature is the ending -e for masculine nominative singular (instead of Western -o) in Sinhalese Prakrit. There are several cases of vocabulary doublets, e.g. the words mässā ("fly") and mäkkā ("flea"), which both correspond to Sanskrit makṣikā but stem from two regionally different Prakrit words macchiā (Western prakrits) and makkhikā (as in Eastern prakrits like Pali).

Pre-1815 Sinhalese literature 

In 1815 the island of Ceylon came under British rule. During the career of Christopher Reynolds (1922–2015) as a Sinhalese lecturer at the SOAS, University of London, he extensively researched the Sinhalese language and its pre-1815 literature: the Sri Lankan government awarded him the Sri Lanka Ranjana medal for this. He wrote the 377-page An anthology of Sinhalese literature up to 1815, selected by the UNESCO National Commission of Ceylon

Substratum influence in Sinhala 
According to Wilhelm Geiger, Sinhala has features that set it apart from other Indo-Aryan languages. Some of the differences can be explained by the substrate influence of the parent stock of the Vedda language. Sinhala has many words that are only found in Sinhala, or shared between Sinhala and Vedda and not etymologically derivable from Middle or Old Indo-Aryan. Possible examples include kola for leaf in Sinhala and Vedda (although others suggest a Dravidian origin for this word.), dola for pig in Vedda and offering in Sinhala. Other common words are rera for wild duck, and gala for stones (in toponyms used throughout the island, although others have also suggested a Dravidian origin). There are also high frequency words denoting body parts in Sinhala, such as olluva for head, kakula for leg, bella for neck and kalava for thighs, that are derived from pre-Sinhalese languages of Sri Lanka. The author of the oldest Sinhala grammar, Sidatsangarava, written in the 13th century CE, recognised a category of words that exclusively belonged to early Sinhala. The grammar lists naramba (to see) and kolamba (fort or harbour) as belonging to an indigenous source. Kolamba is the source of the name of the commercial capital Colombo.

South Dravidian substratum influence

The loss of aspirated stops and the consistent left branching syntax in Sinhala is attributed to a probable South Dravidian substratum effect. This has been explained by a period of prior bilingualism:

Influences from neighbouring languages 
In addition to many Tamil loanwords, several phonetic and grammatical features present in neighbouring Dravidian languages, setting today's spoken Sinhala apart from its Northern Indo-Aryan siblings, bear witness to the close interactions with Dravidian speakers. Some of the features that may be traced to Dravidian influence are –
 the loss of aspiration
 the use of the attributive verb of kiyana "to say" as a subordinating conjunction with the meanings "that" and "if", e.g.:

European influence 
As a result of centuries of colonial rule, interaction, settlement, intermarriage and assimilation, modern Sinhala contains many Portuguese, Dutch and English loanwords.

Influences on other languages 
Macanese Patois or Macau Creole (known as Patuá to its speakers) is a creole language derived mainly from Malay, Sinhala, Cantonese, and Portuguese, which was originally spoken by the Macanese people of the Portuguese colony of Macau. It is now spoken by a few families in Macau and in the Macanese diaspora.

The language developed first mainly among the descendants of Portuguese settlers who often married women from Malacca and Sri Lanka rather than from neighbouring China, so the language had strong Malay and Sinhala influence from the beginning.

Accents and dialects 
The Sinhala language has different types of variations which are commonly identified as 'dialects and accents'. Among those variations, 'regional variations' are prominent. Some of the well-known regional variations of Sinhala language are:

 The Uva Province variation (Monaragala, Badulla).
 The southern variation (Matara, Galle).
 The up-country variation (Kandy, Matale).
 The Sabaragamu variation (Kegalle, Balangoda).

Uva regional variation in relation to grammar
People from Uva province also have a unique linguistic variation in relation to the pronunciation of words. In general, Sinhala singular words are pluralized by adding suffixes like O, hu, wal or waru. But when it comes to Monaragala, the situation is somewhat different as when nouns are pluralized a nasal sound is added.

Southern variation
The Kamath language (an indigenous language of paddy culture) used by the Southerners is somewhat different from the ‘Kamath language’ used in other parts (Uva, Kandy) of Sri Lanka as it is marked with a systematic variation; ‘boya’ at the end of the majority of nouns as the examples below show.

Crops: ‘Kurakkan boya’ (bran)

            ‘Rambakan boya’ (banana)

Tools: ‘Thattu boya’ (bucket)

Other words: ‘Nivahan boya’ (home)

Here the particular word ‘boya’ means ‘a little’ in the Southern region and at the end of most of nouns, 'boya' is added regularly. This particular word 'boya' is added to most words by the Southern villages as a token of respect towards the things (those things can be crops, tools etc.) they are referring to.

Kandy, Kegalle and Galle people

Even though the Kandy, Kegalle and Galle people pronounce words with slight differences, the Sinhalese can understand the majority of the sentences.

Diglossia
In Sinhala there is distinctive diglossia, as in many languages of South Asia. The literary language and the spoken language differ from each other in many aspects. The written language is used for all forms of literary texts but also orally at formal occasions (public speeches, TV and radio news broadcasts, etc.), whereas the spoken language is used as the language of communication in everyday life (see also Sinhala slang and colloquialism). As a rule, the literary language uses more Sanskrit-based words.

Sinhala diglossia can also be described in terms of informal and formal varieties. The variety used for formal purposes is closer to the written/literary variety, whereas the variety used for informal purposes is closer to the spoken variety. It is also used in some modern literature (e.g. Liyanage Amarakeerthi's Kurulu Hadawatha).

The most important difference between the two varieties is the lack of inflected verb forms in the spoken language.

The children are taught the written language at school almost like a foreign language.

Sinhala also has diverse slang. Most slang words and terms were regarded as taboo, and most were frowned upon as non-scholarly. However, nowadays Sinhala slang words and terms, even the ones with sexual references, are commonly used among younger Sri Lankans.

Writing system

Sinhala script, Sinhala hodiya, is based on the ancient Brahmi script, as are most Indian scripts. Sinhala script is closely related to South Indian Grantha script and Khmer script taken the elements from the related Kadamba script.

The writing system for Sinhala is an abugida, where the consonants are written with letters while the vowels are indicated with diacritics (pilla) on those consonants, unlike English where both consonants and vowels are full letters, or Urdu where vowels need not be written at all. The various vowels are written කා , කැ , කෑ  (after the consonant), කි , කී  (above the consonant), කු , කූ  (below the consonant), කෙ , කේ  (before the consonant), කො , කෝ  (surrounding the consonant). One word that is still spelt with an "r" diacritic is ශ්‍රී, as in ශ්‍රී ලංකාව (Sri Lankāwa). The "r" diacritic is the curved line under the first letter ("ශ": "ශ්‍ර"). A second diacritic, this time for the vowel sound  completes the word ("ශ්‍ර": "ශ්‍රීී"). For simple  without a vowel, a vowel-cancelling diacritic (virama) called හල් කිරීම  is used: ක් . Several of these diacritics occur in two forms, which depend on the shape of the consonant letter. Vowels also have independent letters, but these are only used at the beginning of words where there is no preceding consonant to add a diacritic to.

The complete script consists of about 60 letters, 18 for vowels and 42 for consonants. However, only 57 (16 vowels and 41 consonants) are required for writing colloquial spoken Sinhala (suddha Sinhala). The rest indicate sounds that have been merged in the course of linguistic change, such as the aspirates, and are restricted to Sanskrit and Pali loan words. One letter (ඦ), representing the sound /ⁿd͡ʒa/, is attested although no words using this letter are attested.

Sinhala is written from left to right and Sinhala script is mainly used for Sinhala, as well as the liturgical languages Pali and Sanskrit. The alphabetic sequence is similar to those of other Brahmic scripts:

Phonology 

Sinhala has so-called prenasalized consonants, or 'half nasal' consonants. A short homorganic nasal occurs before a voiced stop, it is shorter than a sequence of nasal plus stop. The nasal is syllabified with the onset of the following syllable, which means that the moraic weight of the preceding syllable is left unchanged. For example, tam̆ba 'copper' contrasts with tamba 'boil'.

/f~ɸ/ and /ʃ/ are restricted to loans, typically English or Sanskrit. They are commonly replaced by /p/ and /s/ respectively in colloquial speech. Some speakers use the voiceless labiodental fricative [f], as in English, and some use the voiceless bilabial fricative [ɸ] due to its similarity to the native voiceless bilabial stop /p/.

Long /əː/ is restricted to English loans. /a/ and /ə/ are allophones in Sinhala and contrast with each other in stressed and unstressed syllables respectively. In writing, /a/ and /ə/ are both spelt without a vowel sign attached to the consonant letter, so the patterns of stress in the language must be used to determine the correct pronunciation. Most Sinhala syllables are of the form CV. The first syllable of each word is stressed, with the exception of the verb කරනවා /kərənəˈwaː/ ("to do") and all of its inflected forms where the first syllable is unstressed. Syllables using long vowels are always stressed. The remainder of the syllables are unstressed if they use a short vowel, unless they are immediately followed by one of: a CCV syllable, final /j(i)/ (-යි), final /wu/ (-වු), or a final consonant without a following vowel. The sound /ha/ is always stressed in nouns, adjectives, and adverbs, and so is not pronounced /hə/ except in the word හතලිහ /ˈhat̪əlihə/ ("forty"), where the initial /ha/ is stressed and the final /hə/ is unstressed.

Morphology

Nominal morphology 
The main features marked on Sinhala nouns are case, number, definiteness and animacy.

Cases 
Sinhala distinguishes several cases. The five primary cases are the nominative, accusative, dative, genitive, and ablative. Some scholars also suggest that it has a locative and instrumental case. However, for inanimate nouns the locative and genitive, and instrumental and ablative, are identical. In addition, for animate nouns these cases formed by placing atiŋ ("with the hand") and laᵑgə ("near") directly after the nominative.

The brackets with most of the vowel length symbols indicate the optional shortening of long vowels in certain unstressed syllables.

Number marking 
Forming plurals in Sinhala is unpredictable. In Sinhala animate nouns, the plural is marked with -o(ː), a long consonant plus -u, or with -la(ː). Most inanimates mark the plural through disfixation. Loanwords from English mark the singular with ekə, and do not mark the plural. This can be interpreted as a singulative number.

On the left hand side of the table, plurals are longer than singulars. On the right hand side, it is the other way round, with the exception of paːrə "street". [+Animate] lexemes are mostly in the classes on the left-hand side, while [-animate] lexemes are most often in the classes on the right hand.

Indefinite article 
The indefinite article is -ek for animates and -ak for inanimates. The indefinite article exists only in the singular, where its absence marks definiteness. In the plural, (in)definiteness does not receive special marking.

Verbal morphology 
Sinhala distinguishes three conjugation classes.
Spoken Sinhala does not mark person, number or gender on the verb (literary Sinhala does). In other words, there is no subject–verb agreement.

Syntax 
 Left-branching language (see branching), which means that determining elements are usually put in front of what they determine (see example below).
 An exception to this is formed by statements of quantity which usually stand behind what they define. On the other hand, it can be argued that the numeral is the head in this construction, and the flowers the modifier, so that a more literal English rendering would be "a floral foursome"
 SOV (subject–object–verb) word order, common to most left-branching languages.
 As is common in left-branching languages, it has no prepositions, only postpositions (see Adposition).
There are two existential verbs, which are used for locative predications, but these verbs are not used for predications of class-membership or property-assignment, unlike English is.
 There are almost no conjunctions as English that or whether, but only non-finite clauses that are formed by the means of participles and verbal adjectives.

Semantics 
There is a four-way deictic system (which is rare): There are four demonstrative stems (see demonstrative pronouns)   "here, close to the speaker",   "there, close to the person addressed",   "there, close to a third person, visible" and   "there, close to a third person, not visible".

Sinhalese has an all-purpose odd suffix  (thuma) which when suffixed to a pronoun creates a formal and respectful tone in reference to a person. This is usually used in referring to politicians, nobles, and priests. e.g. oba thuma (ඔබ තුමා) - you (vocative, when addressing a minister, high-ranking official, or generally showing respect in public etc.)

janadhipathi thuma - the president (third person)

Discourse

Sinhala is a pro-drop language: Arguments of a sentence can be omitted when they can be inferred from context. This is true for subject—as in Italian, for instance—but also objects and other parts of the sentence can be "dropped" in Sinhala if they can be inferred. In that sense, Sinhala can be called a "super pro-drop language", like Japanese.

Example: The sentence  , literally "where went", can mean "where did I/you/he/she/we... go".

See also 

 Sinhala honorifics
 Sinhala idioms and proverbs
 Sinhala keyboard
 Sinhala numerals
 Sinhala slang
 Madura English–Sinhala Dictionary

References

Bibliography 
 Gair, James: Sinhala and Other South Asian Languages, New York 1998.

Further reading 
 
 

 
  [several new editions].
  (Article on the use of slang amongst Sinhalese Raggers.)

External links 

 Charles Henry Carter. A Sinhalese-English dictionary. Colombo: The "Ceylon Observer" Printing Works; London: Probsthain & Co., 1924.
 Simhala Sabdakosa Karyamsaya. Sanksipta Simhala Sabdakosaya. Kolamba : Samskrtika Katayutu Pilibanda Departamentuva, 2007–2009.
 Sinhala Dictionary and Language Translator – Madura Online English
 Kapruka Sinhala dictionary
 

 
Southern Indo-Aryan languages
Fusional languages
Languages of Sri Lanka
Subject–object–verb languages